Harwinder Kaur Sandhu is a Canadian politician, who was elected to the Legislative Assembly of British Columbia in the 2020 British Columbia general election. She represents the electoral district of Vernon-Monashee as a member of the British Columbia New Democratic Party.

Electoral Record

Federal

Provincial

References

21st-century Canadian politicians
21st-century Canadian women politicians
British Columbia New Democratic Party MLAs
People from Vernon, British Columbia
Women MLAs in British Columbia
Living people
Year of birth missing (living people)